Timothy Flanders (born September 29, 1991) is a professional Canadian football running back for the Ottawa Redblacks of the Canadian Football League (CFL).

College career
Flanders played college football for the Sam Houston State Bearkats from 2010 to 2013.

Professional career

New Orleans Saints
Upon finishing his collegiate career, Flanders signed as an undrafted free agent with the New Orleans Saints on May 10, 2014. However, he did not make the final roster and was released on August 21, 2014.

Calgary Stampeders
The following year, Flanders signed with the Calgary Stampeders on March 18, 2015, but was released prior to training camp on May 2, 2015.

Cleveland Browns
On August 3, 2015, Flanders signed with the Cleveland Browns, but he was released on September 5, 2015.

BC Lions
On October 6, 2015, Flanders signed with BC Lions to a practice roster agreement. He was promoted to the active roster for the last game of the regular season and played in his first professional game on November 7, 2015 against the Calgary Stampeders where he had three carries for 15 yards. He was not re-signed following the season and was released on November 10, 2015.

Winnipeg Blue Bombers
Flanders signed with the Winnipeg Blue Bombers on May 26, 2016 where he had a more prominent role as a back-up running back. He played in seven games for the team, starting in four, where he had 46 rushing attempts for 281 and three touchdowns. He also had 16 receptions for 148 yards. He played with the Blue Bombers for two more seasons, but only dressed for one game in 2018 while spending the rest of the season on the practice roster. He was released by the Blue Bombers on November 19, 2018.

Calgary Stampeders (II)
Flanders remained unsigned at the start of the 2019 CFL season and eventually signed a practice roster agreement with the Calgary Stampeders on September 30, 2019. He was released by the Blue Bombers on November 19, 2018. However, he was released on October 26, 2019.

Ottawa Redblacks
Flanders signed with the Ottawa Redblacks on December 23, 2019, but did not play in 2020 due to the cancellation of the 2020 CFL season. He then re-signed with the Redblacks on January 18, 2021.

References

External links

1991 births
Living people
BC Lions players
Winnipeg Blue Bombers players
Canadian football running backs
American football running backs
Players of American football from Oklahoma
Sam Houston Bearkats football players
American players of Canadian football
People from Midwest City, Oklahoma
Ottawa Redblacks players
Sportspeople from Oklahoma County, Oklahoma